Desemzia incerta  is a bacterium from the genus of Desemzia which has been isolated from the ovaries of the cicada Tibicen linnei.

References

External links
Type strain of Desemzia incerta at BacDive -  the Bacterial Diversity Metadatabase	

Lactobacillales
Bacteria described in 1941